Songs of Conquest is a turn-based strategy game developed by Lavapotion and published by Coffee Stain Publishing. Inspired by 90s classics such as Heroes of Might and Magic III, the game was released in early access on May 10, 2022 for Microsoft Windows and macOS. It allows players to choose from four unique factions, expand their kingdoms, and wage battle by controlling powerful magicians called Wielders.

Gameplay 

The game can be described as a turn-based strategy-adventure hybrid. The strategy part of the game involves kingdom management, such as recruiting Wielders and units, constructing and improving buildings, as well as turn-based combat skirmishes. The adventure part is supported by the unique fantasy setting and story, presented through a combination of 2D pixel art style, 3D environments, and volumetric lighting.

Development 
From 2019 to May 2021, Swedish development team Lavapotion had reached over 20,000 requests to sign up for Songs of Conquest's closed alpha. The team has kept a direct line of communication with the public through their Discord server, complementing it with updates on their official website's blog posts. The game's release was originally planned for late 2020 but, likely due to the consequences of the COVID-19 pandemic, the launch target was postponed to May 10, 2022. The game released in early access on Steam, GOG.com, and Epic Games Store.

Reception 
While no independent reviews have been published as of October 2021, the public's reception in anticipation of the title's release has been positive, as evidenced by the game having been awarded the title of "Most Anticipated" in the "PC Gaming Show Presentation" during E3 2021.

Songs of Conquest was among the top three best-selling games that were released in 2022 at GOG.com.

References

External links 

 Official website
 Steam marketplace page
 GOG.com marketplace page
Turn-based strategy video games
Windows games
MacOS games
Multiplayer and single-player video games
Fantasy video games
Video games developed in Sweden
Early access video games